Martin Leach-Cross Feldman (January 28, 1934 – January 26, 2022) was a United States district judge of the United States District Court for the Eastern District of Louisiana.

Education and career
Feldman was born in St. Louis, Missouri, the son of Joseph and Zelma (Bosse) Feldman. In 1955, he received a Bachelor of Arts degree from Tulane University in New Orleans, Louisiana and, in 1957, a Juris Doctor from Tulane University Law School. He was a member of the Order of the Coif. He was a United States Army JAG Corps Reserve Captain from 1957 to 1963. Feldman served as a law clerk to Judge John Minor Wisdom of the United States Court of Appeals for the Fifth Circuit from 1957 to 1959. Feldman had a private practice in New Orleans from 1959 to 1983.

Political activism
Feldman was among seventy-one Jewish delegates (prior to his conversion to Roman Catholicism) and alternates to the convention.

In 1974, Feldman lost a race, 67–32, in the Republican State Central Committee to John H. Cade, Jr., for selection as Louisiana Republican National Committeeman.

Judicial ideology
Feldman considered himself a "traditional" or "old-fashioned" conservative. However, in December 2017, he denounced Roy Moore as a "right-wing nut". He was known to err on the side of limited government. When speaking of the Constitution, Feldman once remarked "It says what it says".

Federal judicial service
Feldman was nominated by President Ronald Reagan on September 9, 1983, to a seat on the United States District Court for the Eastern District of Louisiana vacated by Judge Jack Murphy Gordon. He was confirmed by the United States Senate on October 4, 1983, and received his commission the following day. In addition to his service on the District Court in New Orleans, Feldman served a term on the FISA Court from 2010 to 2017.

Robicheaux v. Caldwell
On September 3, 2014, Feldman issued a ruling upholding Louisiana's ban of same-sex marriage. After the United States Supreme Court ruled Section 3 of the Defense of Marriage Act, the federal statute that banned the United States federal government from recognizing same-sex marriage, as unconstitutional in United States v. Windsor, he was the only district federal judge to uphold a state prohibition against same-sex marriage.  Feldman said that the state has a legitimate interest in upholding the state's 2004 amendment to the state constitution defining marriage as between one man and one woman that was approved by 78% of voters. Feldman stated, "marriage is a legitimate concern of state law and policy, and that it may be rightly regulated because of what for centuries has been its role."

Feldman also equated the recognition of marriage without regard to sex to incest, writing that he was concerned that recognizing marriage without regard to the sex of the members of the couple would lead to a slippery slope that would eventually require courts to recognize polygamy and incest.

Lawyers for the plaintiffs immediately announced plans to appeal the ruling.

In January 2015, the case was heard in the Fifth Circuit Appeals Court, alongside cases from Texas and Mississippi. The decision remained unresolved at the time of the June 26 Obergefell decision. Following the Supreme Court decision, the appeals court remanded the case back down to Feldman and the district court for a reversal of order ruling in favor of the Louisiana plaintiffs.

Deep water drilling

On June 22, 2010, Feldman issued a preliminary injunction blocking a six-month moratorium on deep-water offshore drilling in Hornbeck Offshore Services LLC v. Salazar. White House press secretary Robert Gibbs indicated that the Obama administration intended to immediately appeal the decision to the Fifth Circuit Court of Appeals.

Feldman's 2008 financial disclosure report indicates that in that year, he owned stock in Transocean (worth under $15,000), the company that owned the Deepwater Horizon rig, as well as in other oil companies which would be affected by the moratorium. A federal judge is required to consider recusal when he owns shares in one of the parties in the case before him, however none of the companies listed in Feldman's 2008 disclosure were directly involved in the action against Salazar.

Feldman's 2009 financial disclosure report indicates that he had financial investments in multiple BlackRock funds, each valued under $15000, much like the prior year.  Although Blackrock was said to be the largest holder of BP stock, it's not clear that any of these funds held stock in BP.  Feldman held stock in Exxon-Mobil during the hearing on the drilling moratorium and from June 8 to 21, he issued several orders related to the moratorium case.  On June 22, at the "opening of the stock market", he reportedly sold his Exxon-Mobil stock.  Hours later, he issued his ruling lifting the moratorium.

As of the June 9, 2010 amended complaint, Transocean, Black Rock, BP, and Exxon-Mobil were not plaintiffs in the action.

Other rulings

Louisiana bar closures
On August 17, 2020, Feldman ruled that Louisiana's bar closures due to the COVID-19 pandemic are constitutional.

Personal life and death
Feldman died on January 26, 2022, two days before his 88th birthday. He was predeceased by his wife, Melanie ( Pulitzer), who died in 2002. Several years after her death, Feldman converted to Roman Catholicism.

See also

List of Jewish American jurists

References

External links
 
 Martin Feldman, 2009 Financial Disclosure Report
 Martin Feldman, 2008 Financial Disclosure Report

1934 births
2022 deaths
20th-century American Jews
20th-century American judges
21st-century American judges
Converts to Roman Catholicism from Judaism
Judges of the United States District Court for the Eastern District of Louisiana
Lawyers from New Orleans
Politicians from New Orleans
Lawyers from St. Louis
Louisiana Republicans
Tulane University Law School alumni
Military personnel from St. Louis
United States Army officers
United States district court judges appointed by Ronald Reagan
Judges of the United States Foreign Intelligence Surveillance Court